Connor Rhys Hammell (born 27 September  1996) is an English footballer who plays as a midfielder for Keswick FC in Cumbria. He started his career at Carlisle United and also played for Workington.

Career
A Carlisle United youth graduate, Hammell was promoted to the first team in 2014, being assigned #28 jersey. On 20 December 2014 he made his professional debut, coming on as a 79th minute substitute in a 2–1 home win against Northampton Town. Hammell made his second appearance eight days later, playing the entire second half in a 0–3 home loss against York City. After struggling to get into the squad, Hammell went out on loan to his home town club Whitehaven. After that expired, He went to Penrith on loan. On 10 March 2016, Hammell left Carlisle United by Mutual Consent.

On 11 March 2016, Hammell joined Northern Premier League Premier Division outfit Workington until the end of the 2015–16 season.

After his contract expired at Workington, he went to Australia and signed for  Adelaide Comets FC.

References

External links

1996 births
Living people
English footballers
Association football midfielders
Carlisle United F.C. players
Whitehaven A.F.C. players
Penrith F.C. players
Workington A.F.C. players
Adelaide Comets FC players
English Football League players